Halima Echeikh (February 1934 – 18 October 2020), known professionally as Naâma (meaning "grace"), was a Tunisian singer.

Biography 
Naâma, was born in Azmour, in the North of Tunisia into a conservative family. After the divorce of her parents, she lived with her mother between Azmour and the capital city Tunis. Naâma died on 18 October 2020 after a long illness aged 86.

Sources 

 Mohamed Bouthina,  " Naâma. The eternal voice" Tunis, 1997.
 Hamadi Abassi, " Naâma. La fille d'Ezmour ", Saisons tunisiennes, 27 juillet 2007
 https://web.archive.org/web/20090311005332/http://www.saisonstunisiennes.com/articles/naama/

1934 births
2020 deaths
People from Nabeul Governorate
20th-century Tunisian  women singers